Lumholtz is a rural locality in the Cassowary Coast Region, Queensland, Australia.

History 
The locality is believed to have taken its name from Carl Sofus Lumholtz, a Norwegian traveller and anthropologist, who spent his time working in south and northeast Australia as an ethnographer and field researcher during the 1880s.

References 

Cassowary Coast Region
Localities in Queensland